Eidi (Eidiyya) also known as Salami (derived from the word "Salaam", Bangla: সালামী) is a gift that is given to children by older relatives or family friends as part of the celebration of the two Muslim holidays: Eid al-Fitr and Eid al-Adha. Money is most commonly given, but other gifts are also given.

It is typically given to:
 Children by older members of the family. Older relatives usually give money.
 Spouses often give jewelry, clothes, watches, perfume, or makeup.
Parents may give their children clothes, shoes, toys, books, or electronic gadgets.
 Parents and in-laws may give adult children clothes or cosmetics.
 Friends usually give each other eidi cards.
 Siblings usually give each other eidi cards.

See also 
 Red envelope
 Green envelope, in Malay world

References 

Giving
Eid (Islam)